Claudio Rodríguez may refer to:

 Claudio Rodríguez (actor) (1933–2019), Spanish voice actor
 Claudio Rodríguez Fer (born 1956), Spanish- and Galician-language writer
 Claudio Rodríguez (poet) (1934–1999), Spanish poet
 Claudio Rodríguez (footballer, born 1960), Argentine football manager and player
 Claudio Rodríguez (footballer, born 1969), Argentine football manager and player
 Claudio Rodríguez Cataldo (born 1950), Chilean business manager and politician